Império  (English: Empire) is a Brazilian primetime telenovela produced and broadcast by TV Globo. It premiered on 21 July 2014, replacing Em Família and ended on 13 March 2015 replaced by Babilônia.

It was created by Aguinaldo Silva and starred Alexandre Nero, Lília Cabral, Leandra Leal, Caio Blat, Andreia Horta, Daniel Rocha, Nanda Costa, Ailton Graça, Zezé Polessa, Tato Gabus Mendes, Letícia Birkheuer, Maria Ribeiro, Klebber Toledo, Marina Ruy Barbosa, Rafael Cardoso, José Mayer, Marjorie Estiano and Drica Moraes.

Daily, the telenovela was watched by 30 million viewers per minute, number greater than NFL games on American television. Weekly, the accumulated number of viewers reached 100 million.

In November 2015, Império was awarded Best telenovela in the 43rd International Emmy Awards.

Synopsis 

1st phase
The plot brings the male protagonist as rude heartthrob José Alfredo (Chay Suede), a boy who leaves Recife in 1989 to try life in Rio de Janeiro, and during stay in the house of his brother, Evaldo (Thiago Martins), if madly in love coined by itself, Eliane (Vanessa Giacomo), older than him. The lovers decide to flee the state capital to have a life together happily, without having more than live with the shadow of Evaldo. Each writes a letter telling what happened and combine to deliver the cuckolded husband, leaving it to him to read only when the two were already far away. Unfortunately the girl discovers to be pregnant, and Cora (Marjorie Estiano), sister Eliane poisons the girl against Jose Alfredo, who is also the brother of Josué (Alejandro Claveaux), leaving the boy to see ships in the road of this marvelous city.

Alone, José Alfredo part into the unknown and ends up being displayed in the middle of the journey, Sebastian (Reginaldo Faria), suggesting that the boy begins to work with the exploitation of precious stones. Sebastião José Alfredo then decides to take to Switzerland. On the plane, José Alfredo will meet Marta Maria (Adriana Birolli), one from traditional decadent young family, but he sees it as a chance to get your name known in high society and marries her. José Alfredo will also know the Portuguese businesswoman Maria Joaquina Braga (Regina Duarte), which will seep into the smuggling of precious stones market, means by which money appears easier and quicker than the slow and honest toil in their view . Because of the construction of its supposed empire, José Alfredo even be able to kill a man.

2nd phase

Years later, José Alfredo (Alexandre Nero) is separated from Maria Marta (Lilia Cabral), who devotes his life to demonize her ex-husband and the three children try to put to work in the Jewelry Empire project launched by José Alfredo, the millionaire left, in order that it may divert cash ex-husband, leave him bankrupt and feel vindicated. The three sons of the former couple are the cult jewelry designer Maria Clara (Andreia Horta), the ambitious José Pedro (Caio Blat), and the rebel João Lucas (Daniel Rocha). While all this happens, José Alfredo is dedicated to performing expeditions around the world and to meet with his mistress Maria Isis (Marina Ruy Barbosa), one of the interior northeast nymphets who dreams of being a model, but is designed by Mother Magnolia (Zezé Polessa) by father Severo (Tato Gabus Mendes) and brother Roberto (Romulo Neto) to take money from José Alfredo.

The fall of the empire of José Alfredo begins when a powerful pink diamond from South Africa, a symbol of status and power, disappeared on Mount Roraima. In his mystical vision, José Alfredo believes everything falls apart if he does not find your favorite gemstone and get rid of a shiny faux stayed in place. Compounding the ordeal of him, his sister's ex-lover, Cora (Drica Moraes), will reappear stating that Cristina (Leandra Leal) is his bastard daughter Eliane (Malu Galli). The scrappy girl camelódromo works in the center of Rio de Janeiro alone and creates little Victor (Adriano Alves), son of Tuane (Nanda Costa) and his brother Elivaldo (Rafael Losso). Tuane abandoned infant son with her ex-boyfriend and Cristina to go after a rich husband. An accident causes the death of two people and blamed for what happened, Elivaldo ends up being arrested. Meanwhile, Eliane gets sick and dies and debts in camelódromo only accumulate, to the despair of Cristina, who is pressured by Cora demanding their share in the inheritance of the biological father. José Alfredo, however, does not accept recognize her as a daughter, Cristina refuses to have any kind of relationship with the true family or fortune they have amassed. Marta Maria Cristina will do anything to keep away from her husband and her children, rivaling no less dangerous Cora.

Cristina is the girlfriend of simpleton lawyer Fernando (Erom Cordeiro), but their relationship is cold and loveless. Her heart stops beating stronger when she finds a love of childhood, honest Vicente (Rafael Cardoso), an excellent chef who starts working on the arrogant Enrico (Joaquim Lopes), fiancé of Maria Clara restaurant. Cristina Vicente never forgot, but the romance of the two will be setbacks obsessive jealousy of the young Fernando, which will haunt her after the breakup of the two, and also the strong interest that Maria Clara's sister Cristina, nourished by Vicente .

Enrico is the son of Claudius Bolgari (José Mayer), a renowned party organizer of Rio's high society, with quiet Beatriz (Suzy Rêgo). What nobody suspects is that Claudius is bisexual and keeps a secret romance with the passionate and naive Leonardo (Klebber Toledo), who suffers for failing to move up the career as an actor and not have their relationship recognized by Claudio. The two become infernizados by Teo Pereira (Paulo Betti), a journalist who had studied with Claudio affected in adolescence and is surprised to see him leading a heterosexual life, has always believed that his friend was gay. Teo owns a gossip blog about subcelebridades and will aim at exposing the inner life of Claudius for everyone, despite the strong homophobia Enrico shall demonstrate day after day, scaring his father.

Another prominent parallel plot involves Popular Juju (Cris Vianna), former Queen of battery of a samba school who abandoned his career to devote to family. But her husband, artist Orville (Paulo Rocha) is a dishonest forger who ends up having his schemes discovered early in the plot. With her husband in prison, Juju is forced to sell the house to pay their own attorney Carmen (Ana Carolina Dias), a temptress and evil character who cares about Orville and convinces him to abandon Juju to stick with it. When it gets out of jail, Orville goes to live in the former home of Juju side of Carmen, while the ex-queen battery is without a place to live with their young son. Already count|

Production

Zurich, Petrópolis and Carrancas (MG) served as locations for shooting scenes of the first phase of Império. The author of the telenovela, Aguinaldo Silva, had plans to acclimatise the telenovela in Serra Pelada. However, the station showed a series of the same name at the time, which made him change his mind. So Silva chose to use the Venezuelan part of Mount Roraima. However, since the film crews was denied, and filming ended occurring in the Brazilian part of the Mount.

Most critics specialized in television in Brazil considered "bold" the choice of the protagonist of the soap opera, Alexandre Nero. In an interview, Silva said the character was inspired by himself.

Cast

Reception

Ratings

Despite the positive impact, the first chapter of Império registered 32 points in São Paulo and 34 points in Rio de Janeiro, according to Ibope, the second worst debut of a 9PM telenovela in all time, besides Babilônia. However, TV Globo had 24,6 (4x) more points than SBT, the second most-watched station.

Despite the negative debut, the second chapter scored 35 points, with a peak of 37 and 56% share, registering a nine percent growth. Em Família, its predecessor, scored 29 points in his second chapter.

During the week of 27 October7 November 2014, an estimate predicted that the telenovela was watched by about 101.7 million people in this period, registering 30 million viewers per minute, number greater than is registered by the NFL games on American television, which tend to record about 18.1 million viewers per minute.

On 2 March 2015 registered 40 points in São Paulo for the first time. On Tuesday (3) registered 41.

The last chapter was attended by 9,108 million viewers in Greater São Paulo, acquiring an Ibope Rating of 46.0.

Controversy 
Marjorie Estiano has returned to Cora's role in the 2nd phase because Drica Moraes got sick.

Awards and nominations

References

External links 
  

2014 telenovelas
Brazilian telenovelas
2014 Brazilian television series debuts
2015 Brazilian television series endings
TV Globo telenovelas
Brazilian LGBT-related television shows
Gay-related television shows
Portuguese-language telenovelas
Gemstones in fiction